Zeba Shehanz is a Pakistani actress, comedian, host and voice actress. She is known for her roles in dramas Fifty-Fifty, Umrao Jan Ada, Bandish, Aurat Ka Ghar Konsa, Baityaan and Mera Yaar Miladay. She also voiced Parrot in 3 Bahadur: The Revenge of Baba Balaam.

Early life
Zeba was born in 1952 on 24th November in Lahore, Pakistan. She completed her studies from University of Lahore. She did theater and did stages plays. She and Moin Akhter did many comedy shows together.

Career
She made her debut as a child actress on PTV in 1960s. She is best known for portraying 108 characters in Fifty Fifty along with Moin Akhter. She also appeared in dramas Baityaan, Umrao Jan Ada and Mera Yaar Miladay. She also appeared in movie Munda Bigra Jaey in 1995. She did theater for 12 years and she also voiced Parrot in 3 Bahadur: The Revenge of Baba Balaam. For her contributions towards the television industry, she was honored by the Government of Pakistan with Tamgha-e-Imtiaz in 2021.

Personal life
Zeba is married and has one child. She was the aunt of Mohammed Shah Subhani who passed away in 2019.

Filmography

Television

Telefilm

Film

Awards and recognition
 1995 Nigar Award for Best Supporting Actress for Munda Bigra Jaey.
 Special Award for Performance in Fifty Fifty at 1st Indus Drama Awards in 2005.
 Tamgha-e-Imtiaz (Medal of Excellence) Award by the President of Pakistan in 2021.

References

External links
 

1952 births
Living people
20th-century Pakistani actresses
Pakistani television actresses
Nigar Award winners
21st-century Pakistani actresses
Pakistani film actresses
Recipients of Tamgha-e-Imtiaz